Eugénie-les-Bains is a commune in the Landes department, Nouvelle-Aquitaine, southwestern France.

Eugénie-les-Bains is best known for housing a spa resort and three restaurants, all belonging to chef Michel Guérard, inventor of cuisine minceur.

Population

See also
Communes of the Landes department

References

External links
Official site

Communes of Landes (department)